Carina Burman (born 1960) is a Swedish novelist and literature scholar. Her research has been focused on Swedish 18th and 19th century literature. She completed her Ph.D. in literature in Uppsala in 1988 with a dissertation on the Gustavian writer Johan Henric Kellgren. Later production includes a critical edition of previously unpublished letters of the novelist and feminist pioneer Fredrika Bremer in two volumes (1996) and a biography of Bremer (2001).

Together with her husband, Professor Lars Burman, she has published critical editions on behalf of the Swedish Academy of the works of Johan Henric Kellgren (1995), Fredrika Bremer's "Livet i gamla världen. Palestina" (1995) and the poetic works of Erik Gustaf Geijer (1999). Carina and Lars Burman have also edited Bremer's "Grannarne" for the series of Swedish literature published by Svenska Vitterhetssamfundet (2000).

Burman's novels have historical motifs, often taking the form of a pastiches. Her first, "Min salig bror Jean Hendrich"  (1993) deals with Johan Henric Kellgren from the point of view of his brother and his mistress in a series of letters. Her latest two novels, "Babylons gator" (2004) and "Vit som marmor" (2006) have the form of detective novels. "Babylons gator: Ett Londonmysterum" (The Streets of Babylon: A London Mystery), which borrows from English novels of the Victorian period, has Euthanasia Bondeson, a Swedish woman novelist-amateur sleuth visiting London, as its main character. In "Vit som marmor" (White as marble), Euthanasia Bondeson travels to Rome and solves a murder mystery in the Scandinavian artist colony.

Publications

Monographs

 Vältalaren Johan Henric Kellgren, Skrifter utgivna av Avdelningen för litteratursociologi vid Litteraturvetenskapliga institutionen i Uppsala, 23 (dissertation, Uppsala, 1988)
 Mamsellen och förläggarna. Fredrika Bremers förlagskontakter 1828-1865, Litteratur och samhälle 30:1, Avd. för litteratursociologi, Uppsala Universitet, 1995.
 Bremer. En biografi (Stockholm, 2001)
 Den finländska Sapfo. Catharina Charlotta Swedenmarcks liv och verk  (Uppsala, 2004)
 Dubbelt öl ger gott humör (Uppsala University Library, 2015)
 Bellman. Biografin (Stockholm, 2019) on the life of the poet and performer Carl Michael Bellman

Critical editions
 Fredrika Bremer, Grannarne, utgiven med inledning och kommentarer av Carina och Lars Burman. Svenska Författare. Ny serie. Svenska Vitterhetssamfundet (Stockholm, 2000).
 Erik Gustaf Geijer, Dikter, under redaktion av Carina och Lars Burman och med inledning av Torgny Segerstedt. Svenska klassiker utgivna av Svenska Akademien (Stockholm, 1999).
 Fredrika Bremer, Brev. Ny följd I-II. Tidigare ej samlade och tryckta brev utgivna av Carina Burman (Gidlunds förlag, Hedemora, 1996)
 Fredrika Bremer, Livet i gamla världen. Palestina, under redaktion av Carina och Lars Burman och med inledning av Knut Ahnlund. Svenska klassiker utgivna av Svenska Akademien (Stockholm, 1995).
 Johan Henric Kellgren, Skrifter I-II, under redaktion av Carina och Lars Burman och med inledning av Torgny Segerstedt. Svenska klassiker utgivna av Svenska Akademien (Stockholm, 1995).

Novels

 Min salig bror Jean Hendrich (1993)
 Den tionde sånggudinnan (1996)
 Cromwells huvud (1998)
 Islandet (2001)
 Babylons gator (2004)
 Vit som marmor (2006)
 Hästen från Porten (2008)
 Kärleksroman (2009)
 God natt, madame (2021)

Awards and distinctions 

 2001 – Lundequist bookshop's literature prize
 2002 – Tegnér prize
 2007 – Lotten von Kraemer's prize
 2008 – Birger Schöldström's prize
 2015 – Eric och Ingrid Lilliehöök's stipend
 2017 – Disa prize

Footnotes

References
https://web.archive.org/web/20061112102542/http://www.littvet.uu.se/carina_burman.htm

1960 births
20th-century Swedish novelists
Swedish historical novelists
Living people
Swedish women novelists
Women historical novelists
21st-century Swedish novelists
21st-century Swedish women writers
20th-century Swedish women writers